A dual-character concept requires two things to determine category membership: a set of concrete features, and the abstract values that these features serve to realize.
Such concepts were first defined by Joshua Knobe, Sandeep Prasada and George E Newman in 2013.

The prototypical dual-character concept is "artist".
It has both a concrete dimension (technical mastery), and an abstract dimension (aesthetic values). Other examples are scientist, Christian, and gangster.

It has been suggested that the concepts of beauty and gender are dual-character concepts.

References 

Philosophical concepts